Damià "Dami" Sabater Tous (born 3 February 1996) is a Spanish footballer who plays for Lleida Esportiu as a midfielder.

Club career
Born in Palma, Majorca, Balearic Islands, Damià graduated from local RCD Mallorca's youth system, and made his senior debuts with the reserves in the 2014–15 campaign, in Segunda División B. On 7 June 2015 he made his first team debut, starting in a 0–2 away loss against CD Mirandés in the Segunda División championship.

On 12 August 2015 Damià signed a new four-year deal with the club, being definitely promoted to the main squad. He scored his first professional goal on 24 April of the following year, but in a 1–2 loss at CD Lugo.

On 31 January 2017, Damià was loaned to fellow second tier club Lugo until the end of the season. Upon returning, he featured regularly as his side achieved promotion from the third division.

On 30 July 2018, Damià signed for another reserve team, RCD Espanyol B, after terminating his contract with Mallorca.

Career statistics

Club

References

External links
Mallorca official profile 

1996 births
Living people
Footballers from Palma de Mallorca
Spanish footballers
Association football midfielders
Segunda División players
Segunda División B players
RCD Mallorca B players
RCD Mallorca players
CD Lugo players
RCD Espanyol B footballers
CF La Nucía players
Pontevedra CF footballers
CD Eldense footballers
Lleida Esportiu footballers
Spain youth international footballers